Farkhod is an urban-type settlement in Samarkand Region, Uzbekistan. Administratively, it is part of the city Samarkand. The town population in 1989 was 4,134 people.

References

Populated places in Samarqand Region
Urban-type settlements in Uzbekistan